WIVY (96.3 FM) is a radio station broadcasting a soft adult contemporary format. It is licensed to Morehead, Kentucky, United States. The station is currently owned by Gateway Radio Works, Inc. and features programming from ABC Radio.

History
The station went on the air as WWDQ on March 27, 1992.  On May 23, 1994, the station changed its call sign to WIKO, and on April 10, 2003, to the current WIVY.

References

External links

IVY
Soft adult contemporary radio stations in the United States
1992 establishments in Ohio